Óscar Cerruto (1912-1981) was a Bolivian poet, novelist, short story writer, journalist and diplomat. 

Cerruto was born in the city of La Paz in 1912. He wrote Barrage of Fire, named one of the greatest novels ever written in Bolivia.

Considered as one of the five most important Bolivian writers of the past century, Oscar Cerruto is the author of the main social novels published in Bolivia. His work not only includes literature, but also Journalism as well as Spanish grammar studies.

Cerruto died in La Paz in 1981.

1912 births
1981 deaths
Bolivian male poets
Bolivian journalists
Male journalists
Bolivian diplomats
Writers from La Paz
Ambassadors of Bolivia to Uruguay
Bolivian people of Italian descent
20th-century Bolivian poets
20th-century male writers
20th-century journalists